Frédéric Gabillon (born 27 March 1976 in Uzès) is a French professional racing driver that currently competes in the NASCAR Whelen Euro Series, driving the No. 3 Chevrolet SS for RDV Competition in the EuroNASCAR PRO class. He is a three-time runner-up in the Euro Series, having finished second in the championship in 2013, 2016, and 2018.

Racing career
Gabillon started his racing career in Championnat de France Formula Renault in 1997. He then moved to Renault Mégane Trophy in 1999, where he won the French Renault Mégane Trophy in his debut season. After seven years of competing in the Renault Clio Cup, Gabillon made his sports car racing debut in 2007 in the Porsche Carrera Cup France, scoring a total of two wins in three seasons with a best finish of 6th in 2008 and 2009. He then drove in French GT Championship before making a switch to the NASCAR Whelen Euro Series in 2013.

In his first season in the NASCAR Whelen Euro Series, he scored 4 race wins and 10 podiums on his way to finish second in the championship. He was then rewarded with an opportunity to drive in the K&N Pro Series East at the 2013 season finale race at Road Atlanta in a Rick Ware Racing prepared car, but it didn't materialize. The following year, he scored one more win to finish in fourth in the Elite 1 championship before making his racing debut in the United States in the K&N East race at Watkins Glen in a Troy Williams-entered car. Gabillon finished in 12th place after starting from the penultimate row of the grid.

In 2015, he switches teams to RDV Competition, where he has stayed to this day. In 2016, Gabillon became the first driver to finish in the Top 5 in all races of the season, although he would lose the title to Anthony Kumpen by 11 points. He would finish second in the championship again in 2018, this time finishing 28 points behind Alon Day. In the same year, he would make his NASCAR Pinty's Series debut at Circuit Trois-Rivières as part of NASCAR Home Tracks' driver exchange program, driving the No. 07 Dodge Challenger for Dumoulin Competition.

Gabillon struggled the next year as he finished the season in 12th place after scoring just 3 Top-5 and 6 Top-10 finishes. Despite this, he managed to score a victory in the second race at Brands Hatch after a race-long battle with Stienes Longin. Starting from pole position, Gabillon initially lost the lead to Loris Hezemans but he regained the lead after Hezemans received a drive-through penalty for jumping the restart.

Complete motorsports results

NASCAR

Whelen Euro Series - EuroNASCAR PRO
(key) Bold - Pole position awarded by fastest qualifying time (in Race 1) or by previous race's fastest lap (in Race 2). Italics - Fastest lap. * – Most laps led.  ^ – Most positions gained.)

K&N Pro Series East
(key) (Bold – Pole position awarded by qualifying time. Italics – Pole position earned by points standings or practice time. * – Most laps led.)

Pinty's Series
(key) (Bold – Pole position awarded by qualifying time. Italics – Pole position earned by points standings or practice time. * – Most laps led.)

 Season still in progress

References

External links
Official website of Frédéric Gabillon
Frédéric Gabillon profile in the NASCAR Home Tracks website

Career summary on Driver Database

Living people
1976 births
French racing drivers
French Formula Renault 2.0 drivers
NASCAR drivers
People from Uzès
Sportspeople from Gard